Milan High school is a high school in Milan, Tennessee. The number of students is currently unknown. Students can enroll in dual-credit English and Mathematics courses to obtain a credit towards their college requirements.

Public high schools in Tennessee
Buildings and structures in Gibson County, Tennessee
Education in Gibson County, Tennessee